Jean-Pierre Ferland,  (born June 24, 1934, in Montreal, Quebec) is a Canadian singer and songwriter.

Life and career

Ferland began work with Radio-Canada in 1956 as an accountant, but his career there was short lived. Shortly after, he began taking guitar lessons with Stephen Fentock and began to fall in love with music, writing his first musical pieces. After two years of work with Radio-Canada, in February 1958, he began recording the first songs that would eventually comprise his first album Jean-Pierre. However, it was not until 1961 that he became known to the public, with the release of his second album, Rendez-vous à La Coda.

From 1962 to 1970, Ferland spent much time in Europe (mainly in France and Belgium), writing music and recording albums, as well as performing at a multitude of venues, including shows in Olympia and Bobino. In 1968 he won the Académie Charles Cros Award.

In 1970 he launched a disc Jaune which sold 60 000 copies within a year and was followed by live shows at the Montreal's Place des Arts. In 1974 his song T'es mon amour, t'es ma maîtresse  recorded with Ginette Reno became a hit.

In 1976 Ferland was one of the 5 performers (along with Claude Léveillée, Gilles Vigneault, Robert Charlebois et Yvon Deschamps) in the giant outdoor concert for the National Holiday on June 21 in Quebec and on June 23 in Montreal, titled 1 fois 5.  The album of the same name followed and in 1977 it received the Académie Charles Cros Award.

In the 1980s Ferland combined songwriting and touring with a career as a television presenter for several popular shows: Station soleil (Radio Québec, 1981–1987), Tapis rouge (SRC, 1986), L'autobus du showbusiness (SRC, 1987) et Ferland/Nadeau (Télé-Métropole, 1990).

Later career
On October 12, 2006, Jean-Pierre Ferland had a stroke caused by fatigue and stress, causing him to cancel his final concert at the Bell Centre the following day. He did recover quickly, allowing him to give his farewell concert on January 13, 2007. Since retiring from the spotlight, Ferland has made an appearance on the plains of Abraham to perform with Céline Dion on August 22, 2008. Other guest stage appearances, radio and television engagements followed, including coaching in La Voix (season 1). In 2017 Jean-Pierre Ferland released an album La vie m'emeut l'amour m'etonne.

Acclaim
In 1996, he was made an Officer of the Order of Canada, in recognition of his 30 albums released and 450 songs written. In 2003, he was made a Knight of the National Order of Quebec.
In 2005, Jean-Pierre Ferland was honoured by the AV Trust of Canada for the album Jaune with collaboration of Michael Georges. In 1999, Ferland was the recipient of the National Achievement Award at the annual SOCAN Awards held in Montreal. On August 5, 2000, Ferland performed at the wedding of the Hell's Angel René Charlebois, and at the same wedding posed for photographs with Maurice "Mom" Boucher, the leader of the Angels in Quebec at the time.

Discography

 Jean-Pierre – 1959
 Rendez-vous à La Coda – 1961
 J'aime, j'estime, j'amoure – 1962
 Jean-Pierre Ferland à Bobino – 1963
 M'aimeras-tu, m'aimeras-tu pas – 1964
 Jean-Pierre Ferland vol 4 – 1965
 Jean-Pierre Ferland vol 5 – 1966
 Je reviens chez nous – 1968
 Un Peu Plus Loin – 1969
 Jaune – 1970 (with notable, at the time very young, American session musicians Tony Levin and David Spinozza)
 Soleil – 1971
 Les Vierges du Québec – 1974
 Le Showbusiness – 1975
 Quand on Aime on a Toujours 20 Ans – 1975
 1 Fois 5 – 1976
 La Pleine Lune – 1977
 Jean-Pierre Ferland – 1980
 Y'a pas deux chansons pareilles – 1981
 Androgyne – 1984
 Bleu blanc blues – 1992
 Écoute pas ça – 1995
 L'amour c'est d'l'ouvrage- 1999
 Bijoux de famille – 2009
 Jaune/Les Noces D'or – 2011 No. 51 CAN
 Chansons Jalouses – 2016
La vie m'emeut l'amour m'etonne – 2017

References

External links
 Jean-Pierre Ferland (contains video clip) AV Trust.ca MasterWorks recipient 2005

1934 births
Canadian male singer-songwriters
Canadian singer-songwriters
French Quebecers
French-language singers of Canada
Knights of the National Order of Quebec
Living people
Officers of the Order of Canada
Singers from Montreal
Songwriters from Quebec
Writers from Montreal